The Tennessee Municipal League (TML) is an association of the incorporated cities and towns of Tennessee, organized for mutual assistance and improvement. 

The organization's functions include: 
lobbying the Tennessee General Assembly on behalf of municipal governments, 
working with the TML Risk Management Pool, a cooperative risk-sharing arrangement established to provide liability insurance coverage, and 
working with the Tennessee Municipal Bond Fund, which assists local governments in obtaining funding for capital projects.

External links
Tennessee Municipal League
TML Risk Management Pool

Organizations based in Tennessee
Local government in Tennessee